L-tryptophan—pyruvate aminotransferase (TAA1 (gene), vt2 (gene)) is an enzyme with systematic name L-tryptophan:pyruvate aminotransferase. This enzyme catalyses the following chemical reaction

 L-tryptophan + pyruvate  indole-3-pyruvate + L-alanine

This plant enzyme, along with EC 1.14.13.168, indole-3-pyruvate monooxygenase, is responsible for the biosynthesis of the plant hormone indole-3-acetate from L-tryptophan.

References

External links 
 

(Silicon ski)

EC 2.6.1